was a Japanese screenwriter. She wrote the screenplay for Cowboy Bebop and created Wolf's Rain.

Nobumoto died from esophageal cancer on December 1, 2021, at the age of 57.

Filmography
 Series head writer denoted in bold

Anime television series
Hiroshima ni Ichiban Densha ga Hashita (1993)
Cowboy Bebop (1998–1999)
Wolf%27s Rain (2003)
Samurai Champloo (2004)
Space Dandy (2014)
Carole %26 Tuesday (2019)

Anime films
Tobé! Kujira no Peek (1991)
Cowboy Bebop: Knockin' on Heaven's Door (2001)
Tokyo Godfathers (2003)

Live action films
World Apartment Horror (1991)

OVAs
Macross Plus (1994–1995)
 Wolf%27s Rain (2004)

Television movies
 Bakkenrekodo wo Koete (Fuji TV / 2013)

Games 
Kingdom Hearts (scenario supervisor)
Kingdom Hearts II (special thanks)

References

External links 

  
 

1964 births
2021 deaths
Anime screenwriters
Japanese screenwriters
Sunrise (company) people
People from Hokkaido
Deaths from esophageal cancer